The 2001 NCAA Division I Men's Swimming and Diving Championships were contested in March 2001 at the Student Recreation Center Natatorium at Texas A&M University in College Station, Texas at the 78th annual NCAA-sanctioned swim meet to determine the team and individual national champions of Division I men's collegiate swimming and diving in the United States.

Texas again topped the team standings, finishing 140 points ahead of Stanford. It was the Longhorns' second consecutive and eighth overall national title.

Team standings
Note: Top 10 only
(H) = Hosts
(DC) = Defending champions
Full results

See also
List of college swimming and diving teams

References

NCAA Division I Men's Swimming and Diving Championships
NCAA Division I Swimming And Diving Championships
NCAA Division I Men's Swimming And Diving Championships
NCAA Division I Men's Swimming and Diving Championships